Stjepan Šiber (20 August 1938, Gradačac – 25 August 2016, Sarajevo) was a wartime general of the Army of the Republic of Bosnia and Herzegovina. After finishing high school in Gradačac, he went to Ljubljana, where he finished schooling at the military academy. Afterward, he became an officer in the Yugoslav People's Army. By 1992, he had become a lieutenant colonel. In 2000, he was elected to the House of Representatives of Bosnia and Herzegovina.

Bosnian War
In April 1992, he was accepted into a seat in the Presidency of Bosnia and replaced the commanding general of the army. Then, in 1993, he was promoted to brigadier general and obtained a seat in the embassy of Bosnia in Switzerland.

Postwar
He was a member of the Republican Party BiH, together with Stjepan Kljuić, a fellow war member of the Presidency of Bosnia and Herzegovina.

References

1938 births
2016 deaths
Bosnia and Herzegovina generals
People from Gradačac
Members of the Presidency of Bosnia and Herzegovina
Officers of the Yugoslav People's Army
Croats of Bosnia and Herzegovina
Bosnia and Herzegovina people of German descent